Jahangir Park is a public park located in Saddar, Karachi, Pakistan. The park area is 6 acres for which the land was donated by Parsi philanthropist Khan Bahadur Behramjee Jehangirjee Rajkotwala in 1893.

The park also hosted one first-class cricket match in 1956.

History
The park used to maintain a reading room where all daily and evening newspapers were made available.

In 2017, the Government of Sindh spent  on the renovation of the park.

See also
 Karachi Parsi Institute

References

External links

Parks in Karachi
Saddar Town
1893 establishments in British India
Cricket grounds in Pakistan